East Preston is a village and civil parish in the Arun District of West Sussex, England. It lies roughly halfway between Littlehampton and Worthing.

East Preston comprises the following residential areas, from east to west: Kingston Gorse, West Kingston, Angmering-on-Sea, East Preston Village and The Willowhayne.

Village school

The original village school building nowadays houses an estate agent firm. It was built in 1840 and started as a Sunday School funded by George Olliver. He received a reward for reporting a farm labourer (Edmund Bushby) for igniting a hayrick for moving the hay about efficiently. The labourer burned the hayrick in protest against farm machinery replacing manual labour. Bushby was subsequently hanged. Over time the building was enlarged into the village school until it was given to Sussex County Council in 1940. There were four classrooms, one very large room, having a curtain divided it into two. There were two separate playgrounds. This building remained as the village school until 1951 when the new school in Lashmar Road was opened.

Amenities
East Preston and Kingston Village Hall on Sea Road were converted from old barns left to the community by the Warren family of Preston Hall.

East Preston Festival
East Preston Festival started in 1981 and runs each year for ten days at the end of May / beginning of June, with all event proceeds divided between donations to local community groups and good causes, and the funding of subsequent Festivals.

In 2017, the Festival won the A Celebration of Sussex Life, Festival of the Year Award. 

The Festival was unable to run in 2020 due to the Covid-19 pandemic, but a 3-day ‘Mini Festival Weekend’ went ahead successfully in 2021.

Sport and leisure
East Preston has a Non-League football club East Preston F.C. which plays at The Lashmar, Lashmar Road.

Notable people
The stage and film actor Stanley Holloway is buried, together with his wife, at the parish church of St Mary the Virgin, having lived in nearby Angmering for many years. Another county dignitary resident in the parish was Charles Boughton-Leigh (1944–2012).

Other notable residents include:
Mitchell Symons, journalist and bestselling author.
Des Lynam, British television and radio presenter.
Vivian Van Damm, manager and owner of the Windmill Theatre.
Mary Cecil Hay author.
 Richard Henry Walthew (1872–1951) composer, lived at 1 Clarence Drive towards the end of his life.
Israel Zangwill (1864–1926), writer and advocate of Jewish causes. 
Edith Ayrton Zangwill (died 1945), author.
Dr Ernest Vaughn Aylen, step-father of Hollywood actor Peter Lawford, who at birth was named Peter Sydney Ernest Aylen. Peter Lawford became the brother-in-law of John F. Kennedy when he married  Patricia Helen Kennedy in 1954.
Sir Maurice Craig (1866–1935), a British psychiatrist and pioneer in the treatment of mental illness. He was governor of the Royal Hospitals of Bethlem and Bridewell, president of the section of psychiatry at the Royal Society of Medicine and vice-president of the International Committee for Mental Hygiene.  Craig was one of the psychiatrists that Virginia Woolf consulted when she suffered her breakdowns.
Heywood Hardy [1842-1933], noted British artist, who lived in the area from 1909 for most of the rest of his life.
Brigadier Noel Hugh-Jones (1894–1952), decorated career British army officer who in 1942 was front line commander at Sittang Bridge, Burma (Myanmar). He received instructions to destroy the bridge to stop the Japanese advance on Rangoon (Yangton). Due to communication problems he was unaware that many of his Gurkha troops, who were fighting a rear-guard action, were still on the wrong side of the bridge.  After the explosion, he discovered the enormity of the loss of both men and materiel.  He collapsed and it was said his hair turned white within days from the shock.  He was shipped home on medical grounds.  He drowned in 1952 whilst swimming in the sea near East Preston.

See also
 Worthing Rural District

References

External links
 Parish Council Website
 East Preston Village Website
East Preston Festival Website
 Further historical information and sources on GENUKI

Villages in West Sussex
Populated coastal places in West Sussex
Beaches of West Sussex